Hordes of Zombies is the third studio album by American deathgrind band Terrorizer. It was released on February 24, 2012, through Season of Mist. This is Terrorizer's first album since 2006's Darker Days Ahead and the last album to feature bassist David Vincent.

The tracks "Hordes of Zombies" and "Subterfuge" are featured as downloadable content in Rock Band 3 via the Rock Band Network.

A music video was made for "Hordes of Zombies".

Track listing
All lyrics written by Anthony "Wolf" Rezhawk.

Personnel
 Anthony Rezhawk – vocals
 Katina Culture – guitars
 David Vincent – bass
 Pete Sandoval – drums

References

2012 albums
Terrorizer albums
Season of Mist albums